Feather meal is a byproduct of processing poultry; it is made from poultry feathers by partially grinding them under elevated heat and pressure, and then grinding and drying. Although total nitrogen levels are fairly high (up to 12%), the bioavailability of this nitrogen may be low. Feather meal is used in formulated animal feed and in organic fertilizer.

Worldwide, approximately 50 billion chickens were used for human consumption in 2014. Feather meal is made through a process called rendering. This partially hydrolyzes the proteins, which denatures them. It is then dried, cooled and ground into a powder for use as a nitrogen source for animal feed (mostly ruminants) or as an organic soil amendment.

Containing up to 12% nitrogen, it is a source of slow-release, organic, high-nitrogen fertilizer for organic gardens. It is not water-soluble and does not make a good liquid fertilizer.  It can be used to:
Increase green leaf growth
Activate compost decomposition
Improve soil structure

When adding it to a garden as a nitrogen source, it must be blended into the soil to start the decomposition to make the nitrogenous compounds available to the plants.  As an organic garden fertilizer, it is not synthetic or petroleum-based.

Issues 
A 2012 study found that the use of feather meal may contribute to arsenic exposure in humans.

References

Sources
 Organic gardening information
 

Soil improvers
Poultry products
Organic fertilizers